Marko Kovač (born 9 April 1981 in Belgrade, Yugoslavia, today Serbia) is Serbian architect and film director. In 2007. he graduated architecture at the University of Belgrade's School of Architecture. He is a member of Film Artists Association of Serbia.

Filmography

 Chess, animated movie (1998) - 1st award of 31st review of film and video works by children of Yugoslavia at Kinoteka
 Vuk ujeda (Wolf Bites), short movie (2007) - Special award from Telekom Serbia
 Potpisani - episode 1 (2007) - Award Woody dwarf at the festival in Serbian Holywood 2011.
 Potpisani - episode 2 (2008)
 Water Means Life, short movie (2008)
 A Natural Source of Energy, short movie (2008) - 2nd award from TV FOX
 Insurance, short movie (2008) - became part of official movie for Belgrade FEST 2011.
 Carlos Trapéz, 10 short stories (2008,2009)
 Belgrade 2010, short movie (2010) - became part of Beldocs film festival 2010.
 Potpisani - episode 3 (2010) - Award Woody dwarf for the 3rd place at the festival in Serbian Holywood 2012.
 Podbradak potpisanih - mini TV series / 5 episodes (2011)
 Psycho - done in 60 seconds, short movie (2011) - 1st award of Jameson J-Factory festival of movies for 60 seconds, 2012.
 Apocalypto / Greenwoodo, short movie (2012) - 2nd award of Jameson J-Factory festival of movies for 60 seconds, 2014. and Award as voted by the public on "Nikon European Film Festival" in London 2014/15.
 Potpisani - episode 4 (2013)
 Potpisani - episode 5 (2014)
 Yuhor danju, Yuhor noću, advertising (2015) - Main award (Grand Prix) at Yuhor competition
 The Circle, short movie (2015) - Main award at Mikro FAF 2015
 Potpisani - episode 6 (2016)
 Potpisani - episode 7 (2017)
 Potpisani - episode 8 (2019)

References

External links
 
 Marko Kovač interview
 Marko Kovač in ArchNet

1981 births
Architects from Belgrade
Serbian film directors
Film people from Belgrade
Living people
University of Belgrade Faculty of Architecture alumni